Georg Otto Ledderhose (15 December 1855 – 1 February 1925) was a German surgeon, professor and pioneering traumatologist.

He was born in the Bockenheim district of Frankfurt am Main, which had recently lost its status as a free imperial city and been absorbed into the kingdom of Prussia. His father was the Hessian politician Carl Heinrich Ludwig Ledderhose (26 March 1821 - 1 January 1899) and his mother was Wilhelmine Justine Charlotte (nee Pfeiffer; 21 October 1826 - 29 June 1892). Wilhelmine's father was Johann Georg Heinrich Pfeiffer (14 December 1781 - 27 January 1859), the third son of Johann Jakob Pfeiffer, and brother of Burkhard Wilhelm, Carl Jonas, and Franz Georg Pfeiffer. Two of Ledderhose's uncles, the husbands of his mother's sisters, were the chemist Friedrich Wöhler and the jurist Otto Bähr, and another of his mother's sisters was the mother of the Prussian cavalry general Adolf von Deines.  At the time of Georg's birth, his father Carl was serving as a magistrate in the Hessian municipal court, and by 1865, when Georg was only ten years old, Carl had risen to the rank of Electoral Finance minister.

Ledderhose studied medicine at the University of Strasbourg under Georg Albert Lücke, as well as the University of Göttingen under his uncle Friedrich Wöhler. In 1876, while at Göttingen, Ledderhose was enjoying a dinner of lobster with his uncle Freidrich and his professor Felix Hoppe-Seyler, when his uncle suggested that he take the remains of the lobster back to the laboratory. Intrigued, Ledderhose did so, and after exposing the chitinous shells to several compounds, he realized that a concentrated solution of hydrochloric acid caused the shells to dissolve and leave a residue of crystals. Ledderhose later examined these crystals, and determining them to be a discovery new to science, christened them glycosamine. (Although first identified by Ledderhose, the stereochemistry of the compound was not fully defined until 1939 by the work of Walter Haworth.)

Ledderhose received his medical degree from the University of Strasbourg in 1880, after which he practiced surgery at the Hôpital Civil. From 1891, he was named a professor in surgery at his alma mater by his mentor Dr. Lücke. Among his students in the practice of surgery was the polymath and Nobel laureate Albert Schweitzer. He remained the director of the  through the years of the First World War until November 1918, when the victorious French government expelled the majority of Germans living in the territory of Alsace-Lorraine. According to the Alsatian journalist and memoirist Charles Spindler, Ledderhose was known in Strasbourg during the war as a man who provided care and support to the wounded on both sides of the conflict, and who made sure that charitable funds were distributed not only to the Germans, but also the French, and so the French government's summary exile of the doctor came as quite a shock to the populace. Forced to flee the city that had been his home for his entire adult life, Ledderhose resettled in Munich, where the faculty at the University of Munich made him  an honorary professor, and where he taught until his retirement and death.

In addition to his work in discovering glucosamine, Ledderhose is perhaps most famous today for being the first to describe the condition of plantar fibromatosis in 1894, which is now known as Ledderhose's disease in his honor.

Publications
 Über Glykosamin. Trübner, Straßburg 1880 (Dissertation).
 Beiträge zur Kenntniss des Verhaltens von Blutergüssen in serösen Höhlen unter besonderer Berücksichtigung der peritonealen Bluttransfusion. Trübner, Straßburg 1885.
 Die chirurgischen Erkrankungen der Bauchdecken und die chirurgischen Krankheiten der Milz (= Deutsche Chirurgie. Bd. 45b). Enke, Stuttgart 1890.
 Die ärztliche Untersuchung und Beurtheilung der Unfallfolgen. Bergmann, Wiesbaden 1898.
 Die Arthritis deformans als Allgemeinerkrankungen. Trübner, Straßburg 1915.
 Chirurgie des Thorax und der Brustdrüse (= Diagnostische und therapeutische Irrtümer und deren Verhütung: Chirurgie. Bd. 1). Thieme, Leipzig 1920.
 Chirurgie der Wirbelsäule, des Rückenmarks, der Bauchdecken und des Beckens (= Diagnostische und therapeutische Irrtümer und deren Verhütung: Chirurgie. Bd. 2). Thieme, Leipzig 1921.
 Spätfolgen der Unfallverletzungen: Ihre Untersuchung und Begutachtung. Enke, Stuttgart 1921.

References

1855 births
1925 deaths
Academic staff of the Ludwig Maximilian University of Munich
German surgeons
Physicians from Frankfurt
Traumatologists
University of Strasbourg alumni